Platelet-rich plasma (PRP), also known as autologous conditioned plasma, is a concentrate of platelet-rich plasma protein derived from whole blood, centrifuged to remove red blood cells. Though promoted to treat an array of medical problems, evidence for benefit is mixed as of 2020, with some evidence for use in certain conditions and against use in other conditions.

As a concentrated source of blood plasma and autologous conditioned plasma, PRP contains several different growth factors and other cytokines that can stimulate healing of soft tissue and joints. There are some indications for use in sports medicine and orthopedics (acute muscle strains, tendinopathy and muscle-fascial injuries and osteoarthritis), or dermatology (androgenic alopecia, wound healing, and skin rejuvenation) or even in proctology (fistula-in-ano). For preparation of PRP, various protocols are used, with an underlying principle of concentrating platelets to 3–5 times physiological levels, then injecting this concentrate in the tissue where healing is desired. Besides the use in clinical practice PRP has been utilized for various tissue engineering applications in the context of bone, cartilage, skin, and soft tissue repair. It has been reviewed to serve as a source for the "delivery of growth factors and/or cells within tissue-engineered constructs, often in combination with biomaterials".

Medical use
Evidence for benefit of PRP is mixed, with some evidence for use in certain conditions and against use in other conditions. It has been investigated for chronic tendinitis, osteoarthritis, in oral surgery, and in plastic surgery.

Elbow Tendinitis:

A 2022 study from the Journal of Clinical Medicine compared PRP injections to physical therapy. They found that PRP lowered pain scores and increased elbow function significantly.  A 2022 study examined the effectiveness of PRP for elbow tendinopathy. They found that PRP was effective and that the concentration of the platelets and healing factors such as epidermal growth factor (EGF) were correlated with success of treatment.

A 2022 meta-analysis examined 26 studies on PRP for elbow tendinopathy. They found that PRP treated patients rated their results significantly better using validated patient rated outcomes measures.  A 2021 systematic review by the Cochrane Library examined PRP and autologous whole blood injections and concluded that it was "uncertain" if PRP or autologous whole blood injections improved elbow tendon healing.

A 2018 systematic review and meta-analysis of high quality studies found that PRP was beneficial for treatment of lateral epicondylitis.

Numberous systematic reviews and meta-analyses have found that for elbow tendinopathy, PRP is superior to cortisone injections.   It has been shown to have similar or equal effects compared to surgery.  

Rotator Cuff Disease:

A 2022 systematic review and meta-analysis showed improved patient rated outcomes in patients with partial rotator cuff tears.  At 8 weeks post injection, they found PRP to be effective.     A 2021 prospective study examined the effectiveness of PRP for partial thickness rotator cuff tears. Patients were given 2 separate PRP injections and followed for 2 years.  The study noted:  “No adverse events were seen in any patient. Based on global rating scores positive results were seen in 77.9 % of patients at 6 months, 71.6 % at 1 year, and 68.8 % of patients at 2 years”.  They found PRP most effective in more damaged tendons.    A 2021 meta-analysis found that PRP was effective for partial rotator cuff tears but the effects were no longer evident at 1 year.  

PRP has been shown to be superior to cortisone injections in several studies.    This is especially evident in the longer term.  

A 2019 review found it not to be useful in rotator cuff disease.  A 2019 meta-analysis found that, for most outcomes in Achilles tendinopathy, PRP treatment did not differ from placebo treatment.  A 2018 review found that it may be useful. A 2009 review found few randomized controlled trials that adequately evaluated the safety and efficacy of PRP treatments and concluded that PRP was "a promising, but not proven, treatment option for joint, tendon, ligament, and muscle injuries". 

Osteoarthritis:

Tentative evidence supports its use in osteoarthritis (OA) of the knee. A 2019 meta-analysis found that PRP might be more effective in reducing pain and improving function than hyaluronic acid in knee OA.

Dental:

A 2010 Cochrane review of use in sinus lifts during dental implant placement found no evidence of benefit. A 2013 review stated more evidence was needed to determine effectiveness for hair regrowth.

Other Musculoskeletal:

A 2014 Cochrane review of PRP in musculoskeletal injuries found very weak evidence for a decrease in pain in the short term, and no difference in function in the short, medium or long term.  It has not been shown to be useful for bone healing. A 2016 review of PRP use to augment bone graft found only one study reporting a difference in bone augmentation, while four studies found no difference.  As compared to other conservative treatments for non-surgical orthopedic illnesses (e.g. steroid injection for plantar fasciitis), evidence does not support the use of PRP as a conservative treatment. A 2018 review found that evidence was lacking for Achilles tendinopathy.

Adverse effects
Adverse effects have been rarely reported to be low in most trials.  A 2017 systematic review of the literature did not report of the types and number of adverse events.  Health Canada states PRP treatments harvested from, and given back to, the same person (in a single procedure) was not covered by its initial guidance as the procedure falls under health care provider regulatory bodies (rather than Health Canada).  There was weak evidence that suggested that harm occurred at comparable, low rates in treated and untreated people.  Similarly, another 2017 review for treating pain on skin graft donor sites found the evidence for benefit was poor.

Composition

There are three general categories of preparation of PRP based on its leukocyte and fibrin content: leukocyte-rich PRP (L-PRP), leukocyte reduced PRP (P-PRP; leukocyte reduced or pure PRP), leukocyte platelet-rich fibrin.

The efficacy of certain growth factors in healing various injuries and the concentrations of these growth factors found within PRP are the theoretical basis for the use of PRP in tissue repair. Though not required for the process, The platelets collected in PRP can be activated by the addition of thrombin or calcium chloride, which induces the release of the mentioned factors from alpha granules. The addition of Thrombin or Calcium Chloride is not required as the bodies natural thrombin will activate the cells upon injection. The growth factors and other cytokines present in PRP include:
 platelet-derived growth factor
 transforming growth factor beta
 fibroblast growth factor
 insulin-like growth factor 1
 insulin-like growth factor 2
 vascular endothelial growth factor A
 vascular endothelial growth factor C
 epidermal growth factor
 Interleukin 8
 keratinocyte growth factor
 connective tissue growth factor
 Hepatocyte growth factor
 Stromal cell-derived factor 1
 Endostatin

Manufacturing
PRP is prepared by taking blood from the person, and then putting it through centrifugation designed to separate PRP  from platelet-poor plasma and red blood cells. This is usually done by the clinic offering the treatment, using commercially available kits and equipment. The resulting substance varies from person to person and from facility to facility, making it difficult to understand how safe and effective any specific use is.

Society and culture
PRP has received attention in the popular media as a result of its use by athletes. Use in an office setting is not approved by the FDA.

In the 2010s, contentious cosmetic procedures marketed under the name of "vampire facials" grew in popularity, fueled by celebrity endorsement. These "vampire facials" generally center on PRP treatment, and usually (but not always) involve microneedling.

PRP has also been injected into the vagina, in a procedure called "O-shot" or "orgasm shot", with claims that this will improve orgasms. There is no evidence, however, to support these claims.

Doping
Some concern exists as to whether PRP treatments violate anti-doping rules. As of 2010, it was not clear if local injections of PRP could have a systemic impact on circulating cytokine levels, affecting doping tests and whether PRP treatments have systemic anabolic effects or affect performance. In January 2011, the World Anti-Doping Agency removed intramuscular injections of PRP from its prohibitions after determining that there is a "lack of any current evidence concerning the use of these methods for purposes of performance enhancement".

History
In the early 1940s clinicians used extracts of growth factors and cytokines for healing. The term 'platet-rich plasma' was first used in 1954 by Kingsley and in the 1960s the first PRP blood banks were established, becoming popular by the 1970s.  In the 1970s PRP was used in the field of hematology, originally for transfusions to treat thrombocytopenia. Ten years later it was used for maxillofacial surgeries.  PRP was first used in Italy in 1987 in an open heart surgery procedure.  In 2006 PRP was starting to be considered of potential use for both androgenic alopecia and alopecia areata, though research remained mixed.

See also 
 Autologous blood injection
 Autologous conditioned serum
 Hypoxia preconditioned plasma
 Platelet-rich fibrin matrix
 Platelet swirling

References 

Blood products
Transfusion medicine